Aleksander Andresen (born 6 April 2005) is a Norwegian footballer who plays as a forward for Stabæk.

Career statistics

Club

Notes

References

2005 births
Living people
People from Moss, Norway
Norwegian footballers
Norway youth international footballers
Association football forwards
Moss FK players
Stabæk Fotball players
Eliteserien players
Norwegian Second Division players
Norwegian Third Division players
Sportspeople from Viken (county)